Oleg A. Mukhanov (born 1 December 1959 or 8 December 1959) is a Russian electrical engineer. He is an IEEE fellow who has focused on superconductivity. He is the co-inventor of SFQ digital technology. He authored and co-authored over 200 scientific papers and holds 24 patents. He is American and resides in the United States.

Early life 
Mukhanov earned his bachelor’s degree at the National Research Nuclear University/Moscow Engineering Physics Institute, and his M.S. in electrical engineering with honors there in 1983. He earned his Ph.D. in physics from Moscow State University in 1988.

Career 
Mukhanov has over 200 scientific publications including 3 book chapters, 141 peer-reviewed articles and 41 conference papers. He has 24 published and pending patents. He has more than 30 years of experience in the field of superconductivity. 

He led the development of a generation of energy-efficient single flux quantum technology and superconducting ferromagnetic and spintronic random-access memories for energy-efficient computing. He co-invented a digital RF architecture, and led development of the world's first commercial use of superconducting computing, a cryocooled digital radio frequency system based on RSFQ.

Mukhanov was the president of the US Committee on Superconducting Electronics between 2005 and 2007. He is an editor of IEEE Transactions on Applied Superconductivity. He is active in the IEEE Quantum Future Directions Initiative, and he received the IEEE Award for Continuing and Significant Contributions in the field of Small Scale Applied Superconductivity in 2015. He is a member of the American Physical Society.

HYPRES 
Mukhanov joined HYPRES as Chief Technical Officer in 1991 to initiate the development of rapid single flux quantum (RSFQ) superconductor circuit technology, which he co-invented in 1985 at Moscow State University as a PhD student. He worked there from April 1991 to May 2013, eventually attaining the titles of General Manager and Senior Vice-President. There, he led many projects on RSFQ-based circuits, including data processors, radio-frequency signal receivers, signal processors, and cryogenic interfaces for computing, wireless communications, radar, and electronic warfare. In 2011, Mukhanov and his colleagues at Hypres discovered that they could increase the efficiency of superconducting circuits by replacing bias resistors with inductors and Josephson junctions; they published their discoveries in June 2011 in the IEEE Transactions on Applied Superconductivity.

HyPR 
Mukhanov worked as CTO and Senior Executive Vice-President of HyPR from May 2013 to 2019. As of 2016, Mukhanov was the CTO of HYPRES.

SeeQC 
Mukhanov is Chief Technical Officer, co-CEO and co-founder of SeeQC since May 2019. He was appointed as director of SeeQC on 12 June 2018, but resigned on 16 May 2019.

Recognition 

 IEEE Fellow (2012) for leadership in research and development of superconducting digital electronics.

 IEEE Award for Continuing and Significant Contributions in the Field of Small Scale Applied Superconductivity in 2015.

 IEEE Council on Superconductivity (CSC) Outstanding Service Recognition for service as an editor of Special Issues of IEEE Transactions on Applied Superconductivity.

Personal life 
Mukhanov lives in Putnam Valley, New York. He married Irina B. Mukhanov.

References

External links 

Living people
Place of birth missing (living people)
Nationality missing
Fellow Members of the IEEE
Moscow Engineering Physics Institute alumni
Moscow State University alumni
1959 births